Highway 284 (AR 284, Ark. 284, and Hwy. 284) is an east–west state highway in Arkansas Delta. The route of  runs from U.S. Route 49 (US 49) near Fair Oaks east to Highway 1 Business (AR 1B) in Forrest City.

Route description

Highway 284 starts in Forrest City at an intersection with Highway 1B, as Newcastle Road in St. Francis County. It junctions with I-40 at exit 242. It junctions with Highway 306 near Colt a few miles north before crossing the county line. It enters Cross County from the South before joining US 64B and forming a concurrency. When US 64B ends, Highway 284 runs south for less than a quarter of a mile along Highway 1 before continuing westward. After leaving Wynne, the highway intersects Highway 350 and the two run concurrently together southbound before separating. Highway 284 once again return to an westward direction. The highway intersects the northern end of Highway 259 before terminating at US 49 near the Woodruff County line.

History
The highway was created by the Arkansas State Highway Commission on April 24, 1963. Highway 284 was extended west to Highway 39 (now US 49) on June 23, 1965.

A second segment was created from a proposed Forrest City bypass north to the Cross county line on November 23, 1966. The bypass was never built, and the route was extended south in Brinkley over New Castle Road and Arkansas Avenue to the current southern terminus at Highway 1B (Washington Street) on August 26, 1970. The gap between the two routes was closed on December 13, 1972.

On January 8, 1993, following a rerouting around East Arkansas Community College, a minor alignment change resulted in redesignating a former section as Highway 890.

Major intersections
Mile markers reset at some concurrencies.

See also

References

 
 
 

284
Transportation in St. Francis County, Arkansas
Transportation in Cross County, Arkansas
Transportation in Woodruff County, Arkansas